Sir Alexander Carmichael Bruce (185026 October 1926) was a British barrister who served as the second Assistant Commissioner "A" of the London Metropolitan Police, from 1888 to 1914.

Bruce was born in Ferryhill, County Durham, the fourth son of Canon David Bruce. He attended Rossall School in Lancashire and then Brasenose College, Oxford, graduating in 1873 and being called to the Bar at Lincoln's Inn in 1875. He practised on the North-Eastern Circuit until 10 December 1884, when he was appointed Assistant Commissioner. He was knighted on 18 July 1903 and retired in 1914.

Bruce married Helen Fletcher (later Dame Helen Bruce) in 1876. He lived at 82 Lexham Gardens, Kensington.

Footnotes

1850 births
1926 deaths
Assistant Commissioners of Police of the Metropolis
People from Ferryhill
English barristers
Members of Lincoln's Inn
Knights Bachelor
Alumni of Brasenose College, Oxford
People educated at Rossall School
Date of birth missing